The Dream of Christmas is the sixth solo studio and first Christmas album by English singer-songwriter Gary Barlow, released on 26 November 2021 through Polydor Records. The album includes collaborations with actress and singer Sheridan Smith, vocal trio the Puppini Sisters, cellist Sheku Kanneh-Mason and Welsh singer Aled Jones. It was preceded by the singles "Sleigh Ride", the title track, "The Dream of Christmas", and on 24 November 2021, "How Christmas Is Supposed to Be" featuring Sheridan Smith. Barlow toured in the UK in support of the album on his All the Hits Live Tour from 27 November 2021.

Background
Barlow began writing original songs for and working on the album due to the COVID-19 pandemic in 2020, also saying that he "had never listened to those classic Christmas songs with the idea of singing them myself, but as this record evolved, so did my appreciation for these wonderful songs. It all started off as a bit of a dalliance in the studio and before I knew it, I had a whole album!"

Track listing

Charts

References

2021 Christmas albums
Gary Barlow albums
Polydor Records albums